Muné Tsenpo was the 39th Emperor of Tibet (r.  797?-799?). This period of Tibetan history, towards the end, and after the reign of Trisong Detsen is very murky and the sources give conflicting stories and dates.

Mune Tsenpo is a Zhangzhung name meaning Namkha Tsenpo or 'Sky King'.

Trisong Detsen is said to have had four sons. The eldest, Mutri Tsenpo, apparently died young. When Trisong Detsen retired (c. 797) to take up residence at the Nyugmakhar Palace (sMyug ma mkar) in Zungkhar (Zung mkhar), he handed power to the eldest surviving son, Muné Tsenpo.

Most sources say that Muné's reign lasted only about a year and a half, while many Western scholars believe this would have been too short and some have suggested he reigned from 797 to 804. The Deb-ston, however, records a reign of 17 years, but this has been attributed to a misreading of the Chinese accounts.

The dBa' bzhed claims that Muné Tsenpo insisted that his father's funeral be performed according to Buddhist rather than the Bon rites.

Tibetan sources say he tried three times unsuccessfully to ensure the equitable distribution of land and property; but each time the rich got richer and the poor got poorer. He established four major places to worship the Tripitaka and the abhisambodhi.

After a short reign, Muné Tsenpo, was supposedly poisoned on the orders of his mother, Tsephongsa, who was jealous of his beautiful young wife, Queen Phoyongsa. After his death, Mutik Tsenpo was next in line to the throne.

However, Sadnalegs elder brother, Mutik Tsenpo, had been apparently banished to Lhodak Kharchu (lHo-brag or Lhodrag) near the Bhutanese border for murdering a senior minister, although some people believe he ruled for an indeterminate period. Whatever the case, the youngest brother, Sadnalegs, was definitely ruling by 804 CE.

References

Sources
Central Asian Studies (Germany)
http://dabase.org/padma-lb.htm

Tibetan emperors
Buddhist monarchs
8th-century rulers in Asia
8th-century Tibetan people
8th-century births
Date of birth unknown
Date of death unknown
8th-century Buddhists